K with diagonal stroke (Ꝃ, ꝃ) is a letter of the Latin alphabet, derived from K with the addition of a diagonal bar through the leg.

Usage 
This letter is used in medieval texts as an abbreviation for kalendas, calends, as well as for karta and kartam, a document or writ.  The same function could also be performed by "K with stroke" (Ꝁ, ꝁ), or "K with stroke and diagonal stroke" (Ꝅ, ꝅ).

In the Breton language, this letter is used, mainly from the fifteenth to the twentieth century, to abbreviate Ker, a prefix used in place names, similar to the Welsh caer.

Computer encodings
Capital and small K with diagonal stroke is encoded in Unicode as of version 5.1, at codepoints U+A742 and U+A743.

References

Bibliography 
 Adriano Cappelli, Lexicon Abbreviaturarum, J. J. Weber, Leipzig (1928).

Phonetic transcription symbols
Latin letters with diacritics